Georgi Tsonov (Bulgarian: Георги Цонов; born 2 May 1993 in Sliven) is a Bulgarian athlete specialising in the triple jump. He won the silver at the 2015 European U23 Championships, as well as bronze medals at the 2010 Summer Youth Olympics and the 2011 European Junior Championships. His biggest success on senior level is the fifth place at the 2015 European Indoor Championships.

His father, Stoyko Tsonov, was also a triple jumper.

Competition record

Personal bests
Outdoor
Triple jump – 17.03 (+0,5.m/s) (Stara Zagora 2015)
Indoor
Long jump – 7.67 (Bucharest 2015)
Triple jump – 16.78 (Belgrade 2017)

References

1993 births
Living people
Bulgarian male long jumpers
Bulgarian male triple jumpers
Athletes (track and field) at the 2010 Summer Youth Olympics
World Athletics Championships athletes for Bulgaria
Athletes (track and field) at the 2016 Summer Olympics
Olympic athletes of Bulgaria
Olympic male triple jumpers
Sportspeople from Sliven